"Water from the Moon" is a song by Canadian singer Celine Dion, recorded for her second English-language studio album, Celine Dion (1992). The song was commercially released in March 1993 as the fifth single in the United States. In Canada it was a radio single only. "Water from the Moon" was written by Diane Warren and produced by Guy Roche, with additional production by Walter Afanasieff. Warren also sang the background vocals.

Background and release
Two music videos were made for this song. The first one is entirely in black and white (contains some religious sign and scenes). Later, they modified the video to include additional footage of Dion, colored brownish-yellow.

"Water from the Moon" peaked at number seven in Canada. In the US it had moderate success on the adult contemporary format, reaching number 11 on Hot Adult Contemporary Tracks.

Critical reception
American magazine from Billboard complimented the song as a "lush" and "dramatic" ballad. An editor, Larry Flick, wrote that after a brief dance flirtation, "Dion returns to her comfy ballad turf with an appropriately dramatic bit of diva dynamite. Guy Roche's grand production values are the perfect setting for Dion's large, stirring voice". Randy Clark from Cashbox described it as a "big, broken-hearted ballad", stating that "her voice is a natural for hit writer Diane Warren's music, and when backed with the production of Guy Roche and Walter Afanasieff, you got a winner no matter how you look at it, or how big it sells." 

Dave Sholin from the Gavin Report commented, "In the short timespan between her debut album and this follow-up, that awesome vocal presence has only gotten stronger. Pairing this remarkable singer with the songwriting skill of Diane Warren spells slam dunk-and the result is just that". Another editor, Ron Fell, felt it's a "forlorn ballad of exquisite sentimentality". Parry Gettelman from Orlando Sentinel viewed it as "a real Star Search contestant's dream, but Dion manages to keep it from getting too out of hand." In an 2019 retrospective review, Christopher Smith from Talk About Pop Music described it as "high drama" and a "rock-ballad". He added that "it’s another excuse to show off her most prized possession, those amazing lungs!"

Music video
A music video was made to accompany the song. It begins with various people in a small town. Children are going to or from school. Older men are playing dominoes at a cafe. Women with black veils light candles in a church. A young man, working at the pier watches Dion driving in a car through town. She wears a black headscarf. Sometimes she is also seen in a telephone booth or walking on a beach. Occasionally there are close-ups of Dion singing, with dark make-up on her eyelids. Later in the video, the young man is at home. He watches Dion, who are getting out of her car outside his window. He opens the fridge and suddenly Dion appears, pushing him away. Towards the end, a teary-eyed Dion sings. The man, looking through his window, sees Dion driving away in her car. The video was later published on Dion's official YouTube channel in 2019, and had generated more than 2.7 million views as of February 2023.

Track listing
US 7" and cassette single
"Water from the Moon" (Radio Edit) – 4:11
"Little Bit of Love" – 4:27

Charts

Weekly charts

Year-end charts

References

1992 songs
1993 singles
Celine Dion songs
Song recordings produced by Walter Afanasieff
Songs written by Diane Warren
Black-and-white music videos